The Battle of Isly was fought on August 14, 1844 between France and Morocco, near the . Bugeaud, attempting to complete the French conquest of Algeria, instigated the battle without a declaration of war in order to force negotiations concerning Moroccan support for the Algerian resistance leader Abd el-Kader to conclude on terms favorable to the French who demanded the Sultan of Morocco to withdraw support for Abd el-Kader.

Bugeaud, who recovered the Moroccan commander's tent and umbrella (equivalent to capturing a military standard in European warfare), was made Duke of Isly for his victory.

The day following the battle, the Bombardment of Mogador started.

Background 
Since the Invasion of Algiers in 1830, Emir Abd el-Kader had taken lead of the tribes of the region of Mascara to oppose the French in 1832.

The Sultan of Morocco Abd al-Rahman attempted seizing Tlemcen from the French in October 1830. The Sultan sent 5,000 cavalry and infantry. Moroccan soldiers rampaged through the streets of Tlemcen, looting and fighting. The Sultan eventually had to retreat them.

Nevertheless, Abd el-Kader never turned down his will to drive the French out of Algeria. Abd el-Kader had raised a real army, and in November 1839, supported by the Sultan of Morocco Abd al-Rahman, he declared war on France, following the crossing of the Bibans (Iron Gates) by the French army.

In reaction, the French then truly undertook the systematic conquest of the country, which the July monarchy made a reason for national pride and military heroism. This conquest was the work of Marshal Bugeaud, appointed governor in 1840. Abd el-Kader saw his capital destroyed in Taguin in 1843 following the Battle of the Smala and was driven back into the desert. After three years of guerrilla warfare, Abd el-Kader surrendered to Lamoricière in 1847.

Prelude 
On 30 May, French troops of General Bedeau had to repel a Moroccan attack. The Moroccan Qaid crossed the border into Lalla Maghnia, a place sixty kilometres from Tlemcen, and attacked the French camp with his Moroccan cavalry. The attack was soon repulsed by General Lamoricière. The next day Marshal Bugeaud embarked at Algiers. On the 19th, French troops occupied Oujda.

Battle 
On 6 August, Tangier had been bombarded by French ships commanded by François d'Orléans, a son of the King of France, Louis Phillippe I.

Having to deal almost exclusively with cavalry, he had formed from his infantry a large diamond whose faces were themselves made up of small squares. The cavalry was in the interior of the lozenge which marched through one of its angles duly provided with artillery.

At daybreak, seeing the French army advance, the Sultan sent the Moroccan cavalry with a mass of 20,000 to 25,000 cavalry. This charge did not succeed in forcing the lines of tirailleurs, and was soon separated in two by the squares of the advancing cavalry. Bugeaud then brought out his cavalry. This formed by echelons, charged the Moroccan cavalry which was to the left of the army and dispersed it after having defeated several hundred of its cavalry. The first echelon, composed of six squadrons of spahis commanded by Colonel Joseph, rushed to a Moroccan camp and captured eleven pieces of artillery. The Moroccan artillerymen did not have time to reload.

The Moroccan infantry dispersed in ravines where the French cavalry could not pursue them. While the first echelon marched on the camp, the second commanded by Colonel Morris moved on the part of the Moroccan cavalry which was on the right. It was a difficult endeavor. After it was over, the French army concentrated on the Moroccan camp, and soon set out in pursuit to prevent them from rallying.

Consequences 
As a result of the battle, the French captured eleven pieces of artillery, eighteen flags, and all the Moroccan tents. The Moroccans had 800 of their men killed when the French had 27 of their men killed and 99 of them wounded.

References

Battles involving France
Battles involving Morocco
1844 in France
1844 in Morocco
Conflicts in 1844
19th century in Africa
France–Morocco military relations
August 1844 events
1840s in the French colonial empire
Isly